= Ploketta =

Town of ancient Bithynia

Coordinates: 40°25′20″N 29°46′48″E

Ploketta was a town of ancient Bithynia. Its name does not occur in ancient writers but is inferred from epigraphic and other evidence.

Its site is located near Orta Pinarlar, in Asiatic Turkey.
